Vũ Tiến Long (born 4 April 2002) is a Vietnamese professional footballer who plays for V.League 1 side Hà Nội.

International goals

Vietnam U23

Honours
Công An Nhân Dân
V.League 2: 2022

Vietnam U15
 AFF U-17 Youth Championship: 2017
Vietnam U23
 AFF U-23 Championship: 2022
Southeast Asian Games: 2021

References

External links
 

2002 births
Living people
People from Thanh Hóa province
Vietnamese footballers
Vietnam youth international footballers
Association football defenders
V.League 1 players
Competitors at the 2021 Southeast Asian Games
Southeast Asian Games competitors for Vietnam